Meredith Ringel Morris is an American computer scientist who works in human-computer interaction and collaborative web search. She is a senior principal researcher at Microsoft Research, research manager of the Ability Team, and an affiliate professor at the University of Washington in The Paul G. Allen School of Computer Science & Engineering and in The Information School.

Early life and education 

Morris earned her Sc.B. in computer science from Brown University (magna cum laude) and her M.S. and Ph.D. in computer science from Stanford University, where she was advised by Terry Winograd.

Recognition 

 ACM SIGCHI CHI Academy
 ACM Distinguished Members
 TR35 Award
 UIST Lasting Impact Award

References

Year of birth missing (living people)
Living people
American computer scientists
American women computer scientists
Brown University alumni
Stanford University alumni